The 2017 Tipperary Senior Hurling Championship was the 127th staging of the Tipperary Senior Hurling Championship since its establishment by the Tipperary County Board in 1887. The draw for the group stage placings took place on 23 January 2017. The championship began on 28 April 2017 and ended on 8 October 2017.

Thurles Sarsfields were the defending champions and entered the championship in search of a fourth successive title. Ballina and Burgess were relegated after finishing bottom of the relegation group.

The final was played on 8 October 2017 at Semple Stadium in Thurles, between Thurles Sarsfields and Borris-Ileigh, in what was their first meeting in a final in 62 years. Thurles Sarsfields won the match by 1-24 to 0-11 to claim their 36th championship title overall and a fourth title in succession.

Thurles Sarsfields' Pa Bourke was the championship's top scorer with 3-43.

Results

Group stage

Group 1 table

Group 1 results

Group 2 table

Group 2 results

Group 3 table

Group 3 results

Group 4 table

Group 4 results

Relegation playoffs

Relegation section

Relegation playoffs

Knock-out stage

Preliminary quarter-final

Quarter-finals

Semi-finals

Final

Championship statistics

Top scorers

Overall

In a single game

References

Tipperary Senior Hurling Championship
Tipperary Senior Hurling Championship